The 1924 North Carolina State Wolfpack football team was an American football team that represented North Carolina State University during the 1924 college football season. In its first season under head coach Buck Shaw, the team compiled a 2–6–2 record.

Schedule

References

NC State
NC State Wolfpack football seasons
NC State Wolfpack football